Bert Folkard (17 May 1878 – 31 January 1937) was an Australian cricketer. He played fifteen first-class matches for New South Wales between 1910/11 and 1920/21.

Folkard was an all-rounder who batted aggressively, utilizing the pull shot especially, and bowled in-swingers slightly above medium pace. He played well for New South Wales and he was selected in the Australian Test squad to tour South Africa in 1914/15, however the tour was cancelled due to the outbreak of the First World War. He was extremely successful for Balmain in grade cricket, being described by the Melbourne Sporting Globe as the second best player in club cricket to Monty Noble since district cricket was established in New South Wales.

See also
 List of New South Wales representative cricketers

References

External links
 

1878 births
1937 deaths
Australian cricketers
New South Wales cricketers
Cricketers from Sydney